Giovanni Granafei (1605 – 18 March 1683) was a Roman Catholic prelate who served as Archdiocese of Bari (-Canosa) (1666–1683) and Bishop of Alessano (1653–1666).

Biography
Giovanni Granafei was born in Brindisi, Italy in 1605. On 9 June 1653, he was appointed during the papacy of Pope Innocent X as Bishop of Alessano. 
On 22 June 1653, he was consecrated bishop by Marcantonio Franciotti, Cardinal-Priest of Santa Maria della Pace, with Giambattista Spada, Titular Patriarch of Constantinople, and Ranuccio Scotti Douglas, Bishop Emeritus of Borgo San Donnino, serving as co-consecrators. On 11 October 1666, he was appointed during the papacy of Pope Alexander VII as Archdiocese of Bari (-Canosa). He served as Bishop of Bari (-Canosa) until his death on 18 March 1683. While bishop, he was the principal consecrator of Annibale Sillano, Bishop of Castro di Puglia (1653).

References

External links and additional sources
 (for Chronology of Bishops) 
 (for Chronology of Bishops) 
 (for Chronology of Bishops) 
 (for Chronology of Bishops) 

17th-century Roman Catholic archbishops in the Kingdom of Naples
Bishops appointed by Pope Innocent X
Bishops appointed by Pope Alexander VII
1605 births
1683 deaths